was a Japanese actress, voice actress and narrator that worked for Aoni Production. She was most known for the roles of Candice White Adley (Candy Candy), Hiyoko Isu (The Song of Tentomushi), Alexandria Meat (Kinnikuman), Sayaka Yumi (Mazinger Z), Hiroshi Ichikawa (Kaibutsu-kun), Dororo (Dororo), and Gyopi (Goldfish Warning!). Matsushima was born in Chiba Prefecture on December 1, 1940. She died from pancreatic cancer on April 8, 2022, at age 81.

Filmography

Television animation
Sayaka Yumi in Mazinger Z (1973)
Ayumi Himekawa in Glass Mask (1984 TV series)
Candice "Candy" White in Candy Candy (1976-79)
Yoko Asai in Harris no Kaze 
Meat Alexandria, Silver Mask in Kinnikuman
Peach in Fumoon (1980) - Television film
Child C in Galaxy Express 999: Can You Love Like a Mother!! (1980) - Television special
Clotilde Destange in Lupin tai Holmes (1981) - Television special
Elizabeth Frankenstein in Kyōfu Densetsu: Kaiki! Frankenstein (1982) - Television special
Atsumorisou, Kingfisher in Poppen-sensei to Kaerazu no Numa (1982) - Television special
Meat-kun as Kinnikuman: Kessen! Shichinin no Seigi Chōjin vs. Uchū Nobushi (1984) - Television special
Gyopi in Goldfish Warning!
Ugly Duckling and Rudy in Andersen Stories
Dororo in Dororo
Sachiko in Dokaben
Hiroshi in Kaibutsu-kun
Honey Honey in Honey Honey
Shao-Mai in Tatakae!! Ramenman
Hiyoko Ishuu in The Song of Tentomushi
Akane in Akane-chan
Temari in Ranma ½
Kyoko's Mother in Maison Ikkoku
Mama in 21 Emon
Lucy May in Lucy of the Southern Rainbow
Bun Bun in Hoero Bun Bun
JR in Konpora Kid
Little Lulu in Little Lulu and Her Little Friends (episodes 4-26)
Fukiko-san in Fushigi Mahou Fan Fan Pharmacy
Ricky Kentle in Hello! Sandybell
Kuro in Bemubemu Hunter Kotengumaru
Youko in Kick no Oni
Elis in Little Pollon
Vice Admiral Tsuru in One Piece

Animated films
Misuke in Misuke in the Land of Ice (1970)
Jim Hawkins in Animal Treasure Island (1971)
Jack in Maken Liner-0011 Henshin Seyo! (1972)
Sayaka Yumi in Mazinger Z Vs. Devilman (1973)
Hikaru Makiba in Uchu Enban Daisenso (1975)
Baby Chirin in Ringing Bell (1978)
Candice "Candy" White in Candy Candy: Haru no Yobigoe (1978)
Candice "Candy" White in Candy Candy: Candy no Natsu Yasumi (1978)
Chiko in Unico: Black Cloud, White Feather (1979)
Matsumiya Toshiko in Mahō Shōjo Lalabel: Umi ga Yobu Natsuyatsumi (1980)
Ree in The Sea Prince and the Fire Child (1981)
Himiko in Queen Millennia (1982)
Aesop's Mother in Manga Aesop Monogatari (1983)
Meat-kun in Kinnikuman: Ubawareta Chanpion Beruto (1984)
Meat Alexandria as Kinnikuman: Ōabare! Seigi Chōjin (1984)
Meat-kun as Kinnikuman: Seigi Chōjin vs Kodai Chōjin (1985)
Meat-kun as Kinnikuman: Gyakushū! Uchū Kakure Chōjin (1985)
Meat-kun as Kinnikuman: Haresugata! Seigi Chōjin (1985)
Meat-kun as Kinnikuman: New York Kikiippatsu! (1986)
Meat-kun as Kinnikuman: Seigi Chōjin vs Senshi Chōjin (1986)
Shao-Mai as Tatakae!! Ramenman (1988)
Mikujin in Doraemon: Nobita's Dorabian Nights (1991)
Mama as 21 Emon: Uchū Ike! Hadashi no Princess (1992)
Candice "Candy" White in Candy Candy Movie (1992)
Sho's Mother in Katta-kun Monogatari (1995)
Mama as Crayon Shin-chan: Blitzkrieg! Pig's Hoof's Secret Mission (1998)
Tsuru as One Piece Film: Z (2012)
Train Announcer in Mazinger Z: Infinity (2018)

Tokusatsu
Empress Hysteria (eps. 1 - 4, 6 - 14, 16, 20 - 21, 23, 26 - 27, 29 - 31, 33 - 41)/Dowager Empress Hysteria (ep. 41, 47 - 48) in Choriki Sentai Ohranger (1995)
Empress Hysteria in Choriki Sentai Ohranger the Movie

Non-anime roles
Penny Robinson in Lost in Space
Uhura in Star Trek
Mom Unit in Whatever Happened to Robot Jones?

References

External links
Official agency profile 

1940 births
2022 deaths
20th-century Japanese actresses
21st-century Japanese actresses
Aoni Production voice actors
Japanese child actresses
Japanese video game actresses
Japanese voice actresses
Voice actresses from Chiba Prefecture
Voice actors from Funabashi
Deaths from pancreatic cancer